These are the official results of the Men's Shot Put event at the 1999 World Championships in Seville, Spain. There were a total number of 28 participating athletes, with the final held on Saturday 21 August 1999.

Medalists

Schedule
All times are Central European Time (UTC+1)

Abbreviations
All results shown are in metres

Qualification
 Held on Saturday 21 August 1999

Final

See also
 1999 Shot Put Year Ranking

References
 todor66
 iaaf
 trackandfieldnews
 Results (Shot-put)

D
Shot put at the World Athletics Championships